Phyllonorycter memorabilis is a moth of the family Gracillariidae. It is known from California, United States.

The larvae feed on Lathyrus species. They mine the leaves of their host plant. The mine has the form of a large tentiform mine on the underside of the leaf. The loosened lower epidermis is white and so much wrinkled at maturity that the leaf is closely rolled over.

References

memorabilis
Moths of North America
Moths described in 1939